Mahmoud Ahmad Marei (born 1957) is a Syrian politician, lawyer, current head of the Arab Organization for Human Rights, and former secretary-general of the National Democratic Front, a small, opposition party.

Biography
Marei was born in Talfita, Rif Dimashq. He studied law at the Damascus University and graduated in 1993.

He is former president of the Youth Office at the National Coordination Committee for Democratic Change. He was a member of the internal opposition delegation to the Geneva peace talks on Syria (2017).

Marei was a candidate in the 2021 Syrian presidential election. According to the Daily Telegraph, "Few consider former state minister Abdallah Salloum Abdallah and Mahmoud Merhi, a member of the so-called 'tolerated opposition', serious contenders." The Democratic Arab Socialist Union rejected the legitimacy of the elections and distanced itself from Mahmoud Ahmad Marei, saying he had been expelled from the party in 2013.

References 

1957 births
Living people
People from Rif Dimashq Governorate
Damascus University alumni
Syrian politicians
20th-century Syrian lawyers
21st-century Syrian lawyers